The condom challenges are two viral Internet challenges. The first is a challenge involving snorting a latex condom through one's nasal cavity and into the back of the throat; the second is a challenge where a water-filled condom is dropped onto a person's head, typically enveloping the head of the person taking part. Both variations carry a risk of choking and suffocating

Nasal cavity 
The earlier challenge consists of inserting a latex condom into a nostril and snorting it into the nasal cavity and back through the throat to be pulled out of the mouth. The challenge originated in May 2006, when a video was uploaded onto Break.com of a young man successfully completing the challenge. The term "condom challenge" was coined in May 2012 following the widespread popularity of the cinnamon challenge, but the idea dates to the early 1990s when it was a staple of Matt "The Tube" Crowley's performances at the Jim Rose Circus Sideshow, and videos of challenge attempts date to at least 2007. The challenge went viral in 2013, when WorldStarHipHop posted a video of two young women attempting the challenge, and several people subsequently uploaded videos onto the Internet of themselves attempting the challenge.

The stunt poses potential choking hazards.

Water drop 

The later challenge, popularised in November 2015, involves filling a condom with water and filming it being dropped on one's head. This often results in the condom enveloping and adhering to the participant's face, giving the impression that they have somehow became immersed in the water held within the condom. The Guardian newspaper noted the danger in putting an airtight seal over one's nose and mouth.

References 

Challenges
2006 introductions
Condoms